Assekrem is a high plateau in the Hoggar Mountains of southern Algeria. Rising from the larger Atakor plateau, Assekrem is within Ahaggar National Park.

The hermitage of Charles de Foucauld, which continues to be inhabited by a few monks, is at the top of the Assekrem plateau.

References

Sahara
Plateaus of Africa
Landforms of Algeria
Geography of Tamanrasset Province